Maunder is a surname. Notable people with the surname include:

Alexander Maunder (1861–1932), British sport shooter
Annie Scott Dill Maunder (1868–1947), Irish astronomer and mathematician
Edward Walter Maunder (1851–1928), English astronomer
John Henry Maunder (1858–1920), English composer and organist
Jack Maunder (born 1997),English rugby player 
Lucy Maunder, Australian cabaret and theatre performer, daughter of Stuart
Maria Maunder (born 1972), Canadian rower
Paul Maunder (born 1945), New Zealand film director, playwright and cultural activist
Richard Maunder (1937–2018), British mathematician and musicologist
Samuel Maunder (1785–1849), English writer and composer
Stuart Maunder (born 1957), Australian opera director, father of Lucy
Wayne Maunder (born 1937), Canadian-American actor
William Maunder (born 1903), Australian association football player